Imperial Japanese Navy submarines originated with the purchase of five Holland type submarines from the United States in 1904. Japanese submarine forces progressively built up strength and expertise, becoming by the beginning of World War II one of the world's most varied and powerful submarine fleets.

Origins

The Imperial Japanese Navy (IJN) acquired its first submarines during the Russo-Japanese War on 12 December 1904 where they arrived in sections at the Yokohama dockyards. The vessels were purchased from the relatively new American company, Electric Boat, and were fully assembled and ready for combat operations by August 1905. However, hostilities with Russia were nearing its end by that date, and no submarines saw action during the war.

The submarines that Electric Boat sold to Japan were based on the Holland designs, known as Holland Type VIIs similar to the American s. The five imported Hollands were originally built at Fore River Ship and Engine Company in Quincy, Massachusetts under Busch's direction for the Electric Boat Company back in August–October 1904. They were shipped by freighter from Seattle, Washington in Knock-down kit form to Japan, and then reassembled by Arthur Leopold Busch at the Yokosuka Naval Arsenal, which was then Japan's largest naval shipyard, to become Hulls No. 1 through 5 and were designated Type 1 submarines by the Japanese Navy.

Frank Cable, an electrician who was working for Isaac Rice's Electro-Dynamic and Storage Companies along with Rice's Electric Boat, arrived some six months after Busch, training the IJN in the operation of the newly introduced vessels.

In 1904 Kawasaki Dockyard Company purchased plans for a modified version directly from Holland, and built two boats (Hulls No. 6 and 7), with the help of two American engineers, Chase and Herbert, who had been assistants to Holland. The Kawasaki-type submarines displaced 63 and 95 tons when submerged, and measured  in overall length, respectively. both vessels measured  at the beam. This contrasted with the original five imported Hollands-type submarines which had arrived that same year, at over 100 tons submerged,  in overall length and  beam. However both boats could launch only one  torpedo, and each was manned by 14 sailors, whereas the imported Holland-type submarines could fire two torpedoes and could be operated by 13 sailors. This new type was designated the Type 6 submarine by the Imperial Japanese Navy, and was used primarily for test purposes.

The Kaigun Holland #6 was launched at Kobe on 28 September 1905 and was completed six months later at Kure as the first submarine built in Japan. It sank during a training dive in Hiroshima Bay on 15 April 1910. The commanding officer, Lieutenant Tsutomu Sakuma, patiently wrote a description of his sailor's efforts to bring the boat back to the surface as their oxygen supply ran out. All of the sailors were later found dead at their duty stations when this submarine was raised the following day. The sailors were regarded as heroes for their calm performance of their duties until death, and this submarine was preserved as a memorial in Kure until the end of World War II.

Although the capabilities of these first submarines were never tested in combat during the Russo-Japanese War, the first submarine squadron was soon formed at Kure Naval District in the Inland Sea. Following the war, the Japanese government followed submarine developments by the Royal Navy with interest, and purchased two British C-class submarines directly from Vickers, with an additional three built from kits by the Kure Naval Arsenal. These became respectively the Japanese  and  submarines.

In 1909, the first submarine tender, was commissioned.

World War I
Japan, along with the rest of the Allies, drew heavily upon Germany's Guerre de Course (commerce raiding) operations during the First World War, and their submarine successes reinforced Japan's willingness to develop this weapon, resulting in eighteen ocean-going submarines being included in its 1917 expansion program. Japan received nine German submarines as World War I reparations, which allowed her and the other Allies to accelerate their technological developments during the interwar period.

World War II

Imperial Japanese Navy (IJN) submarines formed by far the most varied fleet of submarines of World War II, including manned torpedoes (Kaiten), midget submarines (Kō-hyōteki), medium-range submarines, purpose-built supply submarines (many used by the Imperial Japanese Army, see Type 3), fleet submarines (many of which carried an aircraft), submarines with the highest submerged speeds of the conflict (Sentaka ), and submarines able to carry multiple bombers (World War II's largest submarine, the Sentoku ). They were also equipped with the most advanced torpedo of the conflict, the oxygen-fuelled Type 95 (which are sometimes confused with the famed Type 93 Long Lance torpedo).

Overall, despite their advanced technical innovation, Japanese submarines were built in relatively small numbers, and had less effect on the war than those of the other major navies. The IJN pursued the doctrine of guerre d'escadre (fleet vs fleet warfare), and consequently submarines were often used in offensive roles against warships.  Warships were more difficult to attack and sink than merchant ships, however, because naval vessels were faster, more maneuverable, and better defended.

The IJN submarine arm did have a number of notable successes against American warships, however. During the Battle of Midway,  administered the final coup de grace that sank the fleet carrier , as well as sinking the destroyer . A few months later, on September 15, 1942, with a single salvo of torpedoes, Japanese submarine  sank the fleet carrier  and damaged both the battleship  and the destroyer . On November 13, 1942, the submarine  torpedoed and sank the anti-aircraft cruiser , and a year later on November 23, 1943, the submarine  torpedoed and sank the escort carrier , both with heavy loss of life. The  had the distinction of both severely damaging the heavy cruiser , knocking her out of the war for a year, on October 20, 1942, and of also sinking  (the only American submarine to be sunk by a Japanese submarine in the entire war) on November 16, 1943.

Twice in the first year of the war, Japanese submarines torpedoed the aircraft carrier , and, while not sinking her, put her in the repair yard at a time when the US Navy could ill afford to do without her.

A plane launched from one of the innovative aircraft-carrying submarines, conducted what remains the only ever aerial bombing attack on the continental United States, when Warrant Flying Officer Nobuo Fujita piloting a Yokosuka E14Y scouting plane dropped four 168-pound bombs in an attempt to start forest fires outside the town of Brookings, Oregon, on September 9, 1942. Earlier in the year, in February 1942, the submarine  fired a number of shells from her deck gun at the Elwood Oil Fields near Santa Barbara, California. None of the shells caused any serious damage.

However, as fuel oil diminished and air superiority was lost, Imperial submarines were no longer able to continue with such successes. Once the United States was able to increase its production of destroyers and destroyer escorts, as well as bringing over highly effective anti-submarine techniques learned during the Battle of the Atlantic, they continually took more and more of a toll on Imperial Japanese submarines, which also tended to be not as deeply diving as their Kriegsmarine counterparts.

Accordingly, the Japanese submarine arm had few notable successes against Allied warships during the final two years of the war. One victory was the  knocking the anti-aircraft cruiser  out for the rest of the war with a torpedo hit on November 3, 1944 (this was the first time in almost two years that a Japanese submarine had successfully attacked an Allied ship operating with a fast carrier task force).  A more famous incident was the  torpedoing and sinking heavy cruiser , with heavy loss of life. The sinking occurred on July 30, 1945, just two weeks before the Japanese surrender, at a time when few in the United States Navy expected continued Japanese submarine attacks.

The Imperial Japanese Navy's doctrine of fleet warfare (guerre d'escadre) resulted in its submarines seldom posing a threat to allied merchant convoys and shipping lanes to the degree that the Kriegsmarine's U-boats did as they pursued commerce raiding against Allied and neutral merchant ships.  During the war, IJN submarines did sink about 1 million tons (GRT) of merchant shipping (184 ships) in the Pacific; by contrast U.S. Navy submarines sank 5.2 million tons (1,314 ships) in the same period, while U-boats of Nazi Germany's Kriegsmarine, the IJN's Axis partner, sank 14.3 million tons (2,840 ships) in the Atlantic and other oceans.  During the last two years of the War in the Pacific, many IJN submarines were also occupied serving to transport supplies to isolated island garrisons, ones that had been deliberately bypassed by the Americans and the Australians and which could not be reached by surface transports because of blockade by Allied warplanes and naval vessels.

Early models of IJN submarines were relatively less maneuverable under water, could not dive very deeply, and lacked radar. (Later in the war units that were fitted with radar were in some instances sunk due to the ability of American radar sets to detect their emissions. For example,  sank three such IJN submarines near Japan in just four days). After the end of the conflict, several of Japan's most innovative and advanced submarines were sent to Hawaii for inspection in "Operation Road's End" (I-401, and I-203) before being scuttled by the U.S. Navy in 1946 when the Soviet Union demanded access to the IJN submarines.

Submarine aircraft carriers

The Japanese applied the concept of the "submarine aircraft carrier" extensively, starting with the J3 type of 1937–38. Altogether 41 submarines were built with the capability to carry seaplanes. Most IJN submarine aircraft carriers could carry only one aircraft, but I-14 had hangar space for two, and the giant , three.

Yanagi missions

Yanagi missions were enabled under the Axis Powers' Tripartite Pact to provide for an exchange of strategic materials and manufactured goods between Germany, Italy and Japan. Initially, cargo ships made the exchanges, but when this was no longer possible, submarines were used.

Of these, I-30 was partially successful but was later sunk by a mine, I-8 completed her mission, I-34 was sunk by British submarine , and I-29 by the United States submarine,  (assisted by Ultra intelligence).  made the final attempt.

Submarine types

First-class submarines
This class includes the largest of Japanese submarines, characterized by great size and range.

Type KD1 (I-51)

The  (I-51-class) submarine was the prototype for the types (KD2-KD7) that followed and was based on the German cruiser submarine  and the British L-class submarine.
  – scrapped 1941.

Type KD2 (I-152)

The  (I-152-class) submarine was based on U-139 and the British K-class submarine.
 I-52/ – scrapped 1946–1948.

Type KD3a (4 units)
[[File:I-55.jpg|thumb|Type KD3a submarine I-55 (later I-155).]]

The  (I-153-class) submarines were similar to the Type KD1 and KD2 but with strengthened hulls. In 1945, I-155 and I-158 were modified as Kaiten suicide torpedo carriers, each armed with two kaitens.
I-153 herself was sunk as a target in the Seto Island Sea in 8 May 1946 as part of Operation Bottom.
 /I-154 – scuttled in the Seto Island Sea in May 1946.
I-155 herself surrendered 2 September 1945 and was scuttled in the Seto Island Sea in May 1946.
I-158 herself surrendered on 2 September 1945 and was scuttled off the Gotō Islands on 1 April 1946.

Type KD3b (3 units)

The  (I-156-class) submarines were similar to the Type KD3a but were 16 inches longer and had a different bow shape.
 I-56/ – sank five merchant ships.
 I-57/  – sank  SS Djirak on 7 January 1942.
I-159 surrendered on September 2, 1945, and sunk as a target off the Gotō Islands on 1 April 1946.
  – Accidentally rammed I-63 off Mizunoko Light on 2 February 1939.
  – Accidentally rammed by I-60 off Mizunoko Light on 2 February 1939. Refloated January 1940 and then scrapped.

Type KD4 (3 units)

The  (I-61/I-162-class) submarines were slightly smaller and had four torpedo tubes, but were otherwise similar to the Type KD3.
  – Sunk in collision with gunboat  in Koshiki Channel on 2 October 1941. Refloated in early 1942 and sold for scrap.
 I-62/ – Sank Mikoyan on 3 October 1942, Manon on 7 October 1942 and Fort McCloud on 22 February 1944.

Type KD5 (3 units)

The  (I-165-class) submarines were similar to the Type KD4 but had an improved operating depth.
 I-65/ – Depth-charged off Saipan on 27 June 1945 by a US Navy patrol bomber of VPB-142.
  – Sank in diving accident off Minamitorishima on 29 August 1940.

Type KD6a (6 units)

The  (I-168-class) submarines were similar to the KD5 but with a higher speed.
 I-69/ – Sank in diving accident in Truk Lagoon on 4 April 1944.
  – Sunk by a Douglas SBD Dauntless aircraft from VS-6 on 10 December 1941. This was the first enemy combatant ship sunk by U.S. forces.
 /I-172 – Missing after 28 October 1942.
I-73 was the first warship sunk by a US Navy submarine.

Type KD6b (2 units)

The  (I-174-class) submarines were similar to the KD6a but were one foot longer and 25 tons heavier.
  – sunk off Truk on 12 April 1944 by aircraft from VB-108.

Type KD7 (10 units)

 I-76/ – sank  patrolling off Truk on 16 November 1943, the only known Japanese submarine success against a US submarine –  was a probable second victim by Japanese submarines.
 I-78/ – Missing after 17 June 1943.
 I-79/ – Sank during sea trials in the Seto Island Sea on 14 July 1943. Salvaged 1956-1957 and then scrapped.
 I-81/ – Ran aground and sunk in Kelanoa Harbour on 16 January 1944.

Type J1 (I-1, I-2, I-3, I-4)

The  (I-1-class) submarines were based on the Kaidai II (Type KD2) and German submarine .
  – sunk December 9, 1942 near Kamimbo Bay by PT-59.

Type J1 Mod. (I-5)

The  (I-5-class) submarine was similar to the Type J1, but with facilities for one aircraft.

Type J2 (I-6)

The  (I-6-class) submarine was similar to the I-5 class, but with a catapult for aircraft.
  – sank Clan Ross in the Arabian Sea on April 2, 1942, and Bahadur in the Arabian Sea on April 7, 1942. I-6 herself was accidentally rammed and sunk 16 June 1944 off Hachijō-jima by Toyokawa Maru.

Type J3 (I-7, I-8)

The  (I-7-class) submarines combined the benefits of the Type J2 and the Kaidai V (KD5). This type later led to the Type A, Type B, and Type C submarines.
  – sank Merkus off Cocos Island on March 4, 1942, Glenshiel in the Indian Ocean on April 3, 1942, and USS Arcata off Unalaska on July 14, 1942. I-7 was scuttled on June 23.
  – sank Tjisalak on March 26, 1944, in the Indian Ocean and Jean Nicolet in May 1944.

Type A1 (I-9, I-10, I-11)

The  (I-9-class) submarines were large seaplane-carrying submarines, with communication facilities to allow them to operate as command ships for groups of submarines. The type was also equipped with a hangar for one aircraft.
  – missing south of Funafuti after January 11, 1944.

Type AM1/A2 (I-12)
The  (I-12-class) submarine was similar to the Type A1, but with less powerful engines, giving the type slower surface speed but a longer range.

Type AM2/AM (I-13, I-14)

The  (Type AM (A Modified), I-13-class) submarines was a large seaplane-carrying submarine, with hangar space for two aircraft. These giant submarines were originally of the A2 type, but following the cancellation of a number of I-400-class submarines, their design was revised after construction started to carry a second aircraft. The seaplanes were to be the Aichi M6A1 bomber carrying 800 kg bombs.

 – Surrendered 27 August 1945. Wreck found in 2009.

Type B1 (20 units)

The  (I-15-class) submarines were the most numerous type of submarines of the Imperial Japanese Navy during World War II. In total 20 were made, starting with I-15, the class ship. These were fast, very long ranged, and carried a single Yokosuka E14Y seaplane, located in a hangar in front of the conning tower, launched by a catapult.

The series was rather successful, especially at the beginning of the war. , in 1942, crippled the aircraft carrier . , on 15 September 1942, fired six torpedoes at aircraft carrier , two of which hit the carrier and sank her, the remainder damaging the battleship  and the destroyer  (which sank later);  conducted the only aerial bombing to occur on the continental United States during World War II. On 9 September 1942, I-25 launched its reconnaissance plane, a Yokosuka E14Y code named Glen which proceeded to drop four 168 pound bombs in a forest near present-day Brookings, Oregon. Several of these ships also undertook "Yanagi" missions to Europe.

  – Sank  on 23 December 1941, possibly sank USS Porter on 26 October 1942,  on 17 January 1943,  on 8 February 1943, Mobilube on 18 January 1943, Starr King on 11 February 1943 and Cape San Juan on 12 November 1943. The I-21 herself was missing after 27 November 1943. Possibly sunk off Tarawa by TBF Avengers on 29 November 1943.
  – Missing off Oahu after 24 February 1942. 
  – Sunk 3 September 1943 off the New Hebrides by one or more US destroyers.
  – Sunk 26 July 1944 by 
  – Sunk by a mine near Singapore on 8 October 1942. Salvaged between August 1959 and February 1960 and then scrapped.
  – Missing after 23 March 1944.
  – Sank at Truk 26 September 1942. Refloated 29 December 1942. Sank again 13 June 1944 in the Seto Inland Sea during trials. Salvaged between 23 July and 18 August 1953 and then scrapped.
Salvaged in 1962.
  – Blown up and scuttled off the Gotō Islands on 1 April 1946 along with Ha-106 as part of Operation Road's End.
  – Missing after 7 November 1944.
  – Missing after 25 November 1943.

Type B2 (6 units)

The  (I-40-class) submarines were externally similar to the Type B1, but with a high-tensile strength steel hull and diesel engines of a simpler design. In 1944, I-44 was modified as a Kaiten suicide torpedo carrier, armed with six kaitens.

  – Missing off the Gilbert Islands after 22 November 1943.
  – Missing off Okinawa after 4 April 1945. Possibly sunk off Okinawa by a TBM Avenger of VC-92 on 29 April 1945.

Type B3 (I-54, I-56, I-58)

Eighteen of the twenty-one  (I-54-class) submarines were cancelled in 1943 in favor of the Type E submarine, leaving the I-54, I-56, and I-58. In 1944, I-56 and I-58 were modified as Kaiten suicide torpedo carriers, each armed with four kaitens.
  – Missing off Leyte after 23 October 1944.
  – Possibly sank  sometime after 8 April 1945.
  – Sank  on 30 July 1945. I-58 surrendered on 2 September 1945, and scuttled off the Gotō Islands on 1 April 1946 as part of Operation Road's End. The wreckage of I-58 was found in 2017.

Type C1 (5 units)

The  (I-16-class) submarines were based on the Junsen type submarine and developed from the Type KD6. This type, like the other Type C submarines, was utilized as mother ships for the Kō-hyōteki midget submarines and the Kaiten suicide torpedoes.
  – Sank Susak on 6 June 1942, Aghious Georgios on 8 June 1942, Supetar on 12 June 1942, and Eknaren on 1 July 1942.
  – Sank Wilford on 8 June 1942, Mundra on 2 July 1942, and De Weert on 3 July 1942.
  – Sank Johnstown on 5 June 1942, Christos Markettos on 8 June 1942, Mahronda on 11 June 1942, Hellenic Trader and Clifton Hall on 12 June 1942, Goviken on 29 June 1942, and Steaua Romana on 30 June 1942.
  – Sunk 6 October 1942 by U.S. Navy PBY Catalina.
  – Sank  on 3 June 1942.

Type C2 (I-46, I-47, I-48)

The  (I-46-subclass) submarines were nearly identical to the Type C1 with the exception that the Type C2 lacked the capability to carry the midget submarines. I-47 and I-48 were converted to carry kaiten manned suicide attack torpedoes.
  – Missing after 26 October 1944.
  – Sank  on 20 November 1944. I-47 surrendered on 2 September 1945 and was scuttled off the Gotō Islands on 1 April 1946 as part of Operation Road's End. The wreck of I-47 was found in 2017.

Type C3 (I-52, I-53, I-55)

The  submarines (I-52-class) were submarines of the Imperial Japanese Navy, designed and built by Mitsubishi Corporation, between 1943 and 1944, as cargo carriers. They were quite long and carried a crew of up to 94 officers and enlisted. The Japanese constructed only three of these during World War II (and ), although twenty were planned. They were among the largest submarines ever built to date, and were known as the most advanced submarines of the period. I-53 was converted to carry kaiten manned suicide attack torpedoes.
She was carrying Japanese engineers and a cargo of rubber, gold, and quinine to Germany.
  – Sank  on 24 July 1945. The wreck of the I-53 was found in 2017.
  – Missing after 13 July 1945.

Type D1 (11 units)

This type was designed as transport submarines with torpedoes for self-defense. Five of the submarines — I-361, I-363, I-366, I-367, and I-370 — were later modified to serve as kaiten suicide attack torpedo carriers, each armed with five kaitens.
  – Sunk by mine off Miyazaki on 29 October 1945. Salvaged and scrapped on 26 January 1966.
  – Blown up and scuttled off the Gotō Islands on 1 April 1946 as part of Operation Road's End.
  – Blown up and scuttled off the Gotō Islands on 1 April 1946 as part of Operation Road's End.
  – Scrapped 1946.
  – Sunk at Yokosuka on 18 July 1945, by aircraft from Task Force 38.

Type D2 (I-373)

The  (I-373-class) submarine was designed as a tanker submarine based on the Type D1 but with no torpedoes.
I-373 was the last Japanese submarine sunk in World War II.

Kiraisen Type (4 units)

The  (I-121-class), the only Japanese minelayer submarines, were near-copies of the World War I German minelayer submarine UB-125. Originally numbered I-21, I-22, I-23, and I-24, they were renumbered I-121, I-122, I-123, and I-124, respectively, in 1938. This type saw front-line service during the Second Sino-Japanese War and the first half of World War II, modified to add seaplane refueling to their capabilities, but surviving units were relegated to training duties in September 1943 due to their growing obsolescence.
 I-21/ – Surrendered in September 1945 and scuttled in Wakasa Bay along with Ro-68 and Ro-500 on 30 April 1946. Wreck found in 2018.
 I-24/ – Sank Hareldawns off Luzon on 10 December 1941. I-124 was the first IJN warship sunk by the Royal Australian Navy.

Sen-Ho Type (I-351)

The  (I-351-class) was a tanker/transport submarine.

Sentoku Type (I-400, I-401, I-402)

The  (I-400-class) displaced 5,223 tons surfaced and measured  overall. They had a figure-eight hull shape for additional strength to handle the on-deck hangar for housing the three Seiran aircraft. In addition, they had four anti-aircraft guns, a large deck gun as well as eight torpedo tubes from which they could fire the  Type 95 torpedo.

Three of the Sentoku were built (and ).

To fit the aircraft in the hangar the wings of the aircraft were folded back, the horizontal stabilizers folded down, and the top of the vertical stabilizer folded over so the overall profile of the aircraft was within the diameter of its propeller. A crew of four could prepare and get all three airborne in 45 minutes launching them with a 120-foot (37 m) catapult on the fore deck of the giant submarine.
The wreck was found in 2013.
The wreck was found in 2005.
The wreck was found in 2015.

Sentaka Type (3 units)

The   (I-201''-class) submarines were modern design, and known as Sentaka (From Sen, abbreviation of Sensuikan, "Submarine", and Taka, abbreviation of Kōsoku, "High speed"). Three were built, I-201, I-202, and I-203 (I-204 to I-208 were not completed).

These submarines were designed for mass production. They were high-performance boats, with streamlined all-welded hulls and a high battery capacity supplying two  motors, which had nearly double the horsepower of the German-designed MAN diesels. They were equipped with a snorkel, allowing for underwater diesel operation while recharging batteries.
  – scuttled by the US Navy off the Gotō Islands on 5 April 1946 to avoid trouble between Britain and the Soviet Union (as both nations wanted to acquire the submarine).

Second-class submarines
These submarines included medium-sized, medium-ranged units of the Imperial Japanese Navy.

Type F1 (Ro-1, Ro-2)
 

Constructed between 1917 and 1920,  (Ro-1-class) submarines were the first truly oceangoing Japanese submarines and the earliest to be rated as "second-class" or "medium" submarines. The Fiat-Laurenti-designed submarines had weak hulls, and they did not serve as the basis for future Japanese submarine classes. 
 – Stricken 1932.
 – Stricken 1932.

Type F2 (3 units)

Constructed between 1919 and 1922,  (Ro-3-class) submarines had a modified bridge. Their Fiat diesel engines were unreliable, and like the F1 subclass they did not serve as the basis for future Japanese submarine classes. 
 – Stricken 1932.
 – Stricken 1932.
 – Stricken 1932.

Kaichū I Type (2 units)

Constructed between 1917 and 1919, the  I submarines were the first submarines built to Japanese requirements and designed specifically for service in the waters of East Asia and the Pacific Ocean, with greater hull strength than was common in contemporary European submarines. They had four bow torpedo tubes and two external tubes in trainable cradles on deck. and a  deck gun. 
 – Stricken and hulked in 1932.
 – Stricken and hulked in 1932.

Kaichū II Type (3 units)

Constructed between 1918 and 1920, the  II submarines had a longer range than the Kaichu I submarines, and the two trainable external torpedo tubes were replaced by two fixed external tubes.
 – Stricken and hulked in 1932.
 – Stricken 1932, hulked 1934, and scrapped 1948.
 – Stricken 1933, hulked 1934, and scrapped 1948.

Kaichū III Type (10 units)

Constructed between 1919 and 1921, the  III submarines had slightly improved performance and a greater diving depth than the Kaichu I and II Type submarines. 
 – Stricken in 1933 and hulked in 1934.
 – Stricken in 1936.
 – Stricken in 1936 and hulked; scrapped in 1948.
 – Stricken in 1936 and hulked; scrapped in 1948.
 – Stricken in 1934; sold and scuttled as an artificial reef in 1935.
 – Stricken in 1934; sold and scuttled as an artificial reef in 1935.
 – Stricken in 1934.
 – Stricken and hulked in 1935.
 – Stricken and hulked in 1935.
 – Sank in 1923. Salvaged and returned to service in 1926. Stricken and scrapped in 1936.

Kaichū IV Type (3 units)

The  IV submarines were constructed between 1921 and 1922. The two external torpedo tubes of the previous Kaichū Types were deleted, but the Kaichū IV Type had larger torpedo tubes and carried heavier torpedoes. 
 – Stricken and hulked in 1940; scrapped in 1948.
 – Stricken in 1940 and hulked; scrapped in 1947.
 – Sank in 1935, but salvaged and returned to service. Stricken and hulked in 1940; scrapped in 1948.

Kaichū V Type (4 units)

Constructed between 1921 and 1927, the  IV submarines were designed for anti-commerce warfare and had heavier deck guns than previous Kaichū Type submarines.
 – Stricken in 1936 and hulked in 1940.
 – Stricken and hulked in 1942; scrapped in 1945.
 – Sank in 1923 during trials. Salvaged, disassembled, reconstructed, and completed in 1927. Stricken and hulked in 1945. Scuttled on 5 April 1946.
 – Stricken and hulked in 1942; scrapped in 1945.

Kaichū VI Type (2 units)

The  VI submarines were double-hulled, medium-sized submarines. They were derived from the preceding Kaichū V Type and had improved performance. Constructed between 1933 and 1937, they served as prototypes for the major production Kaichu VII type constructed during World War II. They had a /40) deck gun and Type 95 (known to the Allies as the "Long Lance") torpedoes.
 – Sank  in the Gulf of Papua on 7 August 1942.

Kaichū VII Type (18 units)

The  submarines were the Imperial Japanese Navy′s last medium submarines, and were enlarged and improved versions of the preceding Kaichū VI Type.
 – Missing off the Gilbert Islands after 19 November 1943.
 – Missing off Okinawa after 17 April 1945. Possibly sunk by aircraft from VC-92 on 29 April 1945.
 – Missing southeast of Okinawa after 25 March 1945.
Surrendered at Sasebo in September 1945. Scuttled off the Goto Islands on 1 April 1946 as part of Operation Road's End.

Type L1 (Ro-51, Ro-52)

The  (Ro-51-class) submarines were British L-class submarines built under license by Mitsubishi. 
 – Stricken and hulked on 1 April 1940.
 – Sunk on 29 October 1923, raised, repaired and returned to service. Sank again on 29 October 1925, raised and repaired. Stricken 1 April 1932.

Type L2 (Ro-53, Ro-54, Ro-55, Ro-56)

The  (Ro-53-class) submarines were similar to the Type L1 but with no broadside torpedo tubes and a change in the battery arrangement.
 – Stricken and hulked in 1940.
 – Stricken and hulked in 1940.
 – Stricken 1940.
 – Stricken and hulked in 1940.

Type L3 (Ro-57, Ro-58, Ro-59)

The  (Ro-57-class) submarines were copies of the British submarine .
 – Scrapped in 1946.
 – Scrapped in 1946.
 – Scrapped in 1946.

Type L4 (9 units)

The  (Ro-60-class) submarines were copies of the British submarine .
 – Wrecked on a reef off Kwajalein Atoll on 29 December 1941. Later blew up following an aircraft attack.
 – Scuttled in the Seto Inland Sea in May 1946.
 – Scuttled in the Seto Inland Sea in May 1946.
 – Sunk by a mine in Hiroshima Bay on 12 April 1945.
 – Sank in a diving accident off Kiska on 3 November 1942.
 – Accidentally rammed and sunk by Ro-62 off Wake Island on 17 December 1941.
 – Scrapped in 1946.
 – Scuttled in Wakasa Bay along with Ro-500 and I-121 on 30 April 1946. Wreck found in 2018.

Ko Type (18 units)

The  (Ro-100-class) were medium-sized submarines for use as point-defense submarines.
 – Sunk by mine in the Bougainville Strait on 25 November 1943.
 – Missing off New Guinea after 9 May 1943.
Missing in the Solomon Islands after 28 July 1943.
 – Sank  in the Blanche Channel on 18 July 1943.
 – Missing after 6 July 1943 in the Solomon Islands.
 – Sank  in the Huon Gulf on 3 October 1943.
 – Possibly sank Daisy Moller in the Bay of Bengal on 3 December 1943.
 – Sank Marion Moller in the Bay of Bengal on 6 November 1944.
 – Sunk southeast of Saipan on 17 June 1944 by U.S. Navy patrol aircraft.

Third-class submarines

Sen'yu-Ko Type (10 units)

The  were transport submarines built in 1944–1945. Several of this type were converted to tankers or to mother ships for the midget submarines. Ten of the 12 submarines laid down were completed.
 – Scrapped at Uraga or scuttled off Shimizu (sources disagree) in October 1945.
 – Scrapped at Uraga or scuttled off Shimizu (sources disagree) in October 1945.
 – Scuttled off the Gotō Islands on 1 April 1946 as part of Operation Road's End.
 – Scuttled off Shimizu in October 1945.
 – Scuttled off the Gotō Islands on 1 April 1946 as part of Operation Road's End.
 – Blown up and scuttled along with I-36 off the Goto Islands on 1 April 1946 as part of Operation Road's End.
 – Scuttled off the Gotō Islands on 1 April 1946 as part of Operation Road's End.
 – Scuttled off the Gotō Islands on 1 April 1946 as part of Operation Road's End.
 – Scuttled off the Gotō Islands on 1 April 1946 as part of Operation Road's End.
 – Was 95% complete. Sank in 1945 during construction and later refloated. Scuttled along with Ha-112 off Kii Suido on 15 April 1946. Other sources state that she was scrapped.
 – Scuttled off the Gotō Islands on 1 April 1946 as part of Operation Road's End.
 – Was 95% complete. Scuttled along with Ha-110 off Kii Sundo on 15 April 1946. Other sources state she was scrapped at Kobe.

Sentaka-Ko Type (10 units)

The  (Submarine High speed-Small type) were small, high-speed submarines constructed in 1944–1945 to defend the Japanese Home Islands from an Allied invasion. Of the 79 boats planned, only ten were completed.
 – Sunk as a target off the Gotō Islands on 1 April 1946 along with I-402 as part of Operation Road's End.
 – Scuttled off the Gotō Islands on 1 April 1946 as part of Operation Road's End.
 – Scuttled off the Gotō Islands on 1 April 1946 as part of Operation Road's End.
 – Ran aground in Aburatsu Bay on 29 October 1945, salvaged and then scrapped August to October 1948.
 – Abandoned at Sasebo at 90% complete. Sank in a typhoon on 25 August 1945 and raised in April 1946. Scuttled off Kii Suido Channel on 6 May 1946. Refloated and scrapped at Kobe in 1952.
 – Scuttled by the US Navy along with Ro-31, Ha-210, Ha-215, Ha-216, Ha-219 and Ha-228 off Sasebo Bay on 5 April 1946.
 – Scuttled off the Gotō Islands on 1 April 1946 as part of Operation Road's End.
 – Deliberately run aground on Ganryū-jima on 18 August 1945. Blown up on 11 November 1945 by the US Navy. Salvaged from August to November 1946 and then scrapped.
 – Scuttled by the US Navy along with Ro-31, Ha-207, Ha-215, Ha-216, Ha-219 and Ha-228 off Sasebo Bay on 5 April 1946.
 – Scuttled by the US Navy along with Ro-31, Ha-207, Ha-210, Ha-215, Ha-219 and Ha-228off Sasebo Bay on 5 April 1946.

Midget submarines
This class includes the smallest of the Japanese submarines, from midget submarines to manned torpedoes often used for suicide attacks.

Ko-Hyoteki Type (50 units)

The  class of Japanese midget submarines had hull numbers but no names. For simplicity, they are most often referred to by the hull number of the mother submarine. The midget submarine hull numbers beginning with the character "HA", which can only be seen on a builder's plate inside the hull.

Fifty Ko-hyoteki were built. The "A Target" name was assigned as a ruse – if their design was prematurely discovered by Japan's foes, the Japanese Navy could insist that the vessels were battle practice targets. They were also called "tubes" and other slang names.

Kairyū Type (250 units)

The  was a class of midget submarines designed in 1943–1944, and produced from the beginning of 1945. These submarines were meant to meet the invading American Naval forces upon their anticipated approach of Tokyo.

Over 760 of these submarines were planned, and by August 1945, 250 had been manufactured, most of them at the Yokosuka shipyard.

These submarines had a two-man crew and were fitted with an internal warhead for suicide missions.

Kaiten Type (400 units)

The  was a torpedo modified as a suicide weapon, and used by the Imperial Japanese Navy in the final stages of the Second World War. Kaiten means "return to the sky"; however, it is commonly translated as "turn toward heaven".

Early designs allowed for the pilot to escape after the final acceleration towards the target, although whether this could have been done successfully is doubtful. There is no record of any pilot attempting to escape or intending to do so, and this provision was dropped from later production kaitens.

Six models were designed, the types 1, 2, 4, 5 and 6 were based on the Long Lance type 93 torpedo (24 inch oxygen/kerosene), and the Type 10, based on the Type 92 torpedo (21 inch electric). Types 2, 4, 5, 6 and 10 were only manufactured as prototypes and never used in combat.

Notes

Bibliography

 Baldwin, Hanson W. Sea Fights and Shipwrecks. Hanover House; 1956, NY, USA.
 Boyne, Walter. Clash of Titans. Simon and Schuster; 1995. NY, USA. .
 Hasimoto, Mochisura. Sunk; The Story of the Japanese Submarine Fleet, 1941–1945. Henry Holt, 1954; Reprinted by Progressive Press, NY, 2010. .
 Jentschura, Hansgeorg; Dieter Jung, Peter Mickel. Warships of the Imperial Japanese Navy, 1869–1945. United States Naval Institute, Annapolis, Maryland, USA, 1977. .
 Morris, Richard Knowles, PhD, Who Built Those Subs?, Naval History Magazine, United States Naval Institute Press, October 1998, 125th Anniversary Issue.
 Orita, Zenji. I-Boat Captain. Major Books Pub.; 1976.
 International Directory of Company Histories, Volume 86. Published July 2007. Gale Group/St. James Press.
 The Klaxon, official U.S. Navy submarine force newsletter. Published by the Nautilus Memorial Force Library Force Library and Museum'', Summer issue, 1992. Account of Arthur Busch/Du Busc's key role pioneering America's first submarines for John Philip Holland – and the first five Imperial Japanese Naval Submarines on behalf of the newly formed Electric Boat Company.

External links
 Submarine Pioneers 

 
Imperial Japanese Navy
Submarine warfare in World War II